Bayanmönkhiin Gantogtokh (born 12 April 1972) is a Mongolian wrestler. He competed in the men's freestyle 90 kg at the 1996 Summer Olympics.

References

1972 births
Living people
Mongolian male sport wrestlers
Olympic wrestlers of Mongolia
Wrestlers at the 1996 Summer Olympics
Place of birth missing (living people)